Brian L. Ruhe (born September 6, 1974) is an American former ice sledge hockey player. He won a gold medal with Team USA at the 2002 Winter Paralympics. Brian was selected to the All Star Team B for his defensive performance in the tournament.

Life 
Brian L Ruhe was born in Greenville, Ohio to Fredrick and Belinda Ruhe.  He graduated Greenville Senior High School in 1992 and then attended the University of Cincinnati in the Aerospace Engineering program.  During the winter semester of his freshman year, Brian was in a motor vehicle accident.

Athletic career 
Ruhe began playing ice sledge hockey in 2000.  Brian was recruited by Sylvester Flis while he was working out at the Rehabilitation Institute of Chicago's (RIC) gym.  Brian joined the next practice session and joined the RIC-Chicago Blackhawks.  He became the starting defenseman and played with the team until 2006.

Music 
Brian L Ruhe is a bass player.  He played in several cover bands in Chicago, until he met Pablo Mena and Wendi Freeman and formed Daemon Familiar.

References

Living people
1974 births
Paralympic sledge hockey players of the United States
American sledge hockey players
Paralympic gold medalists for the United States
People from Greenville, Ohio
Sportspeople from Ohio
Medalists at the 2002 Winter Paralympics
Paralympic medalists in sledge hockey
Ice sledge hockey players at the 2002 Winter Paralympics